Spirodela oligorrhiza is a species of plants in the family Araceae.

Sources

References 

Flora of Malta
Lemnoideae